The southern red-breasted plover or southern New Zealand dotterel (Charadrius obscurus obscurus) is a bird endemic to New Zealand, and was once widespread across the South Island, though now it breeds nearly exclusively on Stewart Island.

Taxonomy
Traditionally, the southern New Zealand dotterel and its cousin, the northern New Zealand dotterel, were lumped together into one species under the name New Zealand dotterel. However, studies have shown that there are significant morphological differences to justify the separation of these two subspecies, with the southern subspecies being far bulkier. Not only that, but different environments on the South Island may have given rise to different features, such as stronger winds necessitating a longer middle toe and claw. There are also significant differences in behavior, with the northern New Zealand dotterel preferring sandy beaches, while the southern New Zealand dotterel prefers inland nest sites, wintering on the South Island's beaches. In 2014, this subspecies was split by some taxonomic authorities.

Distribution and habitat
While it was formerly found throughout the South Island, it is currently restricted to Stewart Island, where it breeds on inland mountain tops, plains, and river valleys.

Status
The population of Southern New Zealand dotterels has fluctuated. It has largely died out in the South Island due to introduced predators such as feral cats and stoats. However, population numbers swelled to around 290 birds in 2005, followed by intense decline to around 120 individuals. The cause is unknown. It is not due to a lack of recruitment, but rather a decline of mature birds. Consequently, it has been categorized as critically endangered.

References

southern New Zealand dotterel
Stewart Island
southern New Zealand dotterel
Taxa named by Johann Friedrich Gmelin
Subspecies